

The LIPNUR Sikumbang (manufacturer designation X-01) was a low-wing monoplane of mixed construction built in Indonesia in 1954 as a COIN and anti-guerrilla-warfare aircraft. Of conventional configuration, it had fixed tricycle undercarriage and seated the pilot under a bubble canopy. A single example was built under the designation NU-200 in 1954, and another as the NU-225 in 1957. The latter machine was grounded in 1967.

Specifications (NU-200)

See also
LIPNUR Belalang
LIPNUR Kunang
LIPNUR Super Kunang

References

 
 
 Harapan dan Tanggapan Pemerhati dan Mitra

1950s Indonesian attack aircraft